The ETX metric, or expected transmission count, is a measure of the quality of a path between two nodes in a wireless packet data network. It is used extensively in mesh networking algorithms.

History
Douglas S.J. De Couto was the first to describe ETX in his 2004 doctoral dissertation at MIT. Subsequently, it has been implemented in RoofNet/Meraki and OLSR mesh networking protocols, among others.

In the context of the OLSR protocol, a bidirectional link ETX was defined.

Details
ETX is the number of expected transmissions of a packet necessary for it to be received without error at its destination. This number varies from one to infinity. An ETX of one indicates a perfect transmission medium, where an ETX of infinity represents a completely non-functional link. Note that ETX is an expected transmission count for a future event, as opposed to an actual count of a past event. It is hence a real number, and not an integer. For example, if it took 1898 transmissions to transfer 1024 packets without error, the ETX on the link is 1898/1024, or approximately 1.85. Due to varying characteristics of the transmission medium, the number may vary widely.

It is often useful to convert between ETX and the packet error probability :

An equivalent relation is used for bidirectional links in the context of the OLSR protocol:  where NLQ is the Neighbor Link Quality of the link and LQ is its link quality. Thus, .

References

Routing algorithms
Wireless networking